Christopher or Chris Spencer may refer to:

Christopher Miner Spencer (1833–1922), American inventor
Chris Spencer (actor), African-American actor, comedian, writer and producer
Chris Spencer (musician), American noise rock musician, leader of the band Unsane
Chris Spencer (American football) (born 1982), American football player
Cold War Steve, British collage artist and satirist, born Christopher Spencer

See also

Chris Spence (disambiguation)